Jianqiao may refer to:

Jianqiao, Fengshun County, a town in Fengshun County, Guangdong, China
Jianqiao Airport, an airport in Hangzhou, Zhejiang, China